Mike Malin may refer to:

 Michael C. Malin (born 1950), planetary geologist
 Mike Malin (television personality) (born 1970), Big Brother houseguest and winner